Mary Doretta Heebner (born April 19, 1951) is an American artist and author.

Early life and education 
Heebner was born on April 19, 1951 in Los Angeles, California to Claire Lucille Menei and Walter Schussler Heebner.  Her father, Walter, was a professional musician, composer, and songwriter, then as an executive at RCA Records and Capitol Records.  Mary Heebner attended Providence High School, where Corita Kent and Daniel Berrigan made occasional contact.

She attended the University of California, Santa Barbara's College of Creative Studies and graduated with a B.A. in 1973.  She also received her M.F.A. from UC Santa Barbara in 1977, working under William Dole.

Career 
Heebner's work has been in both private and public collections including: San Francisco Museum of Modern Art, the National Gallery of Art, the National Museum of Women in the Arts, the Library of Congress, the British Library, the New York Public Library, Stanford University, Dartmouth College, Columbia University, University of Chicago, University of Michigan, Indiana University, and Santa Barbara Museum of Art.

She founded simplemente maria press in 1995, which produces limited edition artist's books that combine her paintings and writing.  Heebner has also created separate artist's books derived from her paintings based on the works of William Shakespeare, Pablo Neruda and Clayton Eshleman.  HarperCollins published trade editions of two of Heebner's artist's books that paired her paintings with the poems of Pablo Neruda, which featured translations by Scottish writer Alastair Reid, printed in honor of the poet's 100th birthday.  The first book, On the Blue Shore of Silence, was followed in 2008 by a companion volume, Intimacies.

Heebner has an abiding interest in antiquity. In 1995 she wrote and illustrated a monograph, Old Marks, New Marks, with an essay by Carolyn Radlo, linking her practice to ancient mark making. In 1997 she was invited by the French minister of culture to visit the Lascaux cave, which has been closed to the public since 1963. This inspired a series of paintings and an artist's book, Scratching the Surface: a visit to Lascaux and Rouffignac, which prompted an invitation to revisit Lascaux. A visit to Angkor and Ayutthaya led to large installation pieces ("Bodhisattvas at Ayutthaya" and "Ancient Presences" and three artist books (Full Lotus, Bayon: Sketches from Bayon Temple, Angkor Thom, and Silent Faces/Angkor) and the series Geography of A Face: Khmer. 
Repeated visits to Patagonia in Chile inspired a series of paintings and the subsequent artist book Unearthed.

Heebner's interest in Classical sculpture influenced a series of large paintings including the Venus Paintings, exhibited in 2013, of which Dr. Bruce Robertson has written, "Heebner had miraculously rescued these sculptures from the museums she has seen them in and returned them to the world they came from, a world of change, accident, thick encrustations and vaporous atmosphere."

Personal life 
Heebner currently resides in Santa Barbara, California with photographer and husband Macduff Everton, whom she married in 1989.  She had previously married Steven E. Craig on March 11, 1972.  She has a daughter, Sienna Craig.

References

External links 
 
 UC Santa Barbara Department of Art biography
 simplemente maria press website
 Video Interview with Mary Heebner
 Video Interview with Mary Heebner & Macduff Everton
 Video Interview Mary Heebner

1951 births
Living people
Book artists
People from Santa Barbara, California
University of California, Santa Barbara alumni
Women book artists
Painters from California
20th-century American painters
21st-century American painters
American women painters
20th-century American women artists
21st-century American women artists